CMA may stand for:

Accounting 
 Certified Management Accountant
  Chartered market analyst, designation of the American Academy of Financial Management
 Comparative market analysis, in real estate
 Institute of Certified Management Accountants of Sri Lanka or CMA Sri Lanka

Associations 
 California Medical Association, US
 Canadian Malayalee Association
 Canadian Medical Association
 Canadian Motorcycle Association
 Canadian Museums Association
 Catholic Medical Association
 Chess'n Math Association
 Chinese Musicians' Association
 Chinese Muslim Association, a religious organization in Taiwan
 Christian Ministers' Association
 Christian and Missionary Alliance
 Christian Motorcyclists Association
 Community Media Association
 Constitutional Monarchy Association, a formation of the International Monarchist League
 Country Music Association
 Council of Magickal Arts
 Crystal Meth Anonymous
 Cumberland Miners' Association

Colleges and schools 
 Camden Military Academy, South Carolina, US
 Columbia Military Academy, Tennessee, US
 California State University Maritime Academy, Vallejo, California, US

Government
 Capital Market Authority (disambiguation): regulatory bodies in various countries
 Catchment Management Authority (disambiguation), Australia
 Census metropolitan area, a Canadian census area
 Chennai Metropolitan Area, India
 China Meteorological Administration
 Common Monetary Area
 Competition and Markets Authority, a regulatory body in the United Kingdom
 Computer Misuse Act 1990
 Council for Multicultural Australia, former name of the Australian Multicultural Council

Science

Biology
Chaperone-mediated autophagy

Chemistry
 Calcium magnesium acetate, an inorganic compound
 Chloromethamphetamine
 Complex metallic alloys

Other science 
 Canis Major, astronomical constellation abbreviation "CMa"
 CMA (AAMA), a certified medical assistant in the US 
 Covariance Matrix Adaptation Evolution Strategy (CMA-ES)
 Critical medical anthropology

Transportation
 Central Mountain Air, an airline based in Smithers, British Columbia, Canada
 Compagnie des Messageries Aériennes, a French airline
 Compañía Mexicana de Aviación, a Mexican airline
 Cunnamulla Airport (IATA airport code CMA), Queensland, Australia
 Camarillo Airport (FAA lid code CMA), California, USA
 CMA CGM
Compact Modular Architecture platform, a modular car platform developed by Geely
 Congestion management agency, a type of county-level agency in California

Other uses 
 Calculated Match Average, motorcycle speedway handicap
 CMA (AAMA), medical assistant credential
 Clearwater Marine Aquarium
 Cleveland Museum of Art
 Country Music Association Awards (CMA Awards or CMAs)
 Cumbria, ceremonial county in England
 Ćma, 1980 Polish film, The Moth in English
 Koho language (ISO 639 language code cma)

See also

 
 CMAS (disambiguation)